Esther Koimett, is a Kenyan public-servant experienced in investment promotion, banking, privatisation, public enterprise and public policy. She is presently the Principal Secretary State Department Of Broadcasting And Telecommunication, Ministry of  ICT, Innovation and Youth Affairs following her appointment by former president Uhuru Kenyatta in January 2020 .  Prior to her appointment in the ICT docket, Esther served as the Principal Secretary, State Department for Transport , Ministry of Transport, Infrastructure,Housing, Urban Development & Public Works since her appointment in August, 2018.

She has  also worked as the Director General Public Investment and Portfolio Management at the National Treasury.  Esther also served as the Managing Drector and Chief Executive Officer of the Kenya Post Office Savings Bank.

She has been instrumental in supporting the development of various notable policies in Kenya that include the amendment of the National ICT Policy Guidelines to spur and support the growth of Business Process Outsourcing companies in Kenya. She was instrumental in the drafting of the Privatization Bill which was enacted into law in 2005.

Background and education
She was born on in Kenya circa 1967. She is the first-born to the late Moi-era politician Nicholas Biwott. She holds a Bachelor of Commerce (BCom) degree and a Master of Business Administration (MBA) degree, both from the University of Nairobi.

Work experience
Her long career in Public Service which exceeds 25 years in length, involves service as the permanent secretary in the Ministry of Tourism and Information and as the managing director of Kenya Post Office Savings Bank. For at least 18 of those years, she has been involved in investment promotion,  public enterprise reform and privatization. She has been responsible for the divestiture of parastatal companies either through the selection of a "strategic investor", or through the flotation of an IPO, on the Nairobi Stock Exchange. Some of the privatized companies through this process, include Kenya Reinsurance Corporation, Tourism Promotion Services, Kenya Railways Corporation, Kenya Airways, Kenya Commercial Bank Group, Housing Finance Group of Kenya,  Mumias Sugar Company Limited, Kenya Electricity Generating Company and Safaricom.

As Principal Secretary, State Department of Broadcasting and Telecommunications she Ioversees all the State Corporations under the Department Namely :-

a) Competition Authority of Kenya

b) Postal Corporation of Kenya

c) Kenya Broadcasting Corporation

d) Media Council of Kenya

e) Kenya Film Classification Board

f) Kenya Film Commission

g) Kenya Institute of Mass Communications

h) Kenya Year Book Board

As  PS, Transport she was in charge of overseeing the Kenya Airways and all the State Corporations under the Department Namely :-

i) Kenya Ports Authority

j) Kenya Railways Corporation

k) LAPPSET Corridor

l) Kenya Airport Authority

m) Kenya Civil Aviation Authority

n) Kenya Ferry Services

Other considerations
Among the numerous boards that she has been or is currently a member are: (a) Kenya Railways Corporation (b) Telkom Kenya Limited (c) Mumias Sugar Company Limited (d) Nairobi Stock Exchange (e) Safaricom Limited.(f) The African Trade Insurance Agency (ATI).

Family
Esther Koimett is married with four children.

See also
 Rose Ogega
 Carole Kariuki
 Kathryne Maundu
 Linda Watiri Muriuki

References

External links
Website of The National Treasury Kenya
Website of Kenya Post Office Savings Bank

Living people
1957 births
Kalenjin people
Kenyan bankers
University of Nairobi alumni
People from Elgeyo-Marakwet County